Verkhnia Rozhanka is a village in Stryi Raion, Lviv Oblast in western Ukraine. It belongs to Slavske settlement hromada, one of the hromadas of Ukraine.
Local government — Nyzhnorozhanska village council.

Geography 
The village is located  the between highest of picturesque mountains. West of the village are the vertices Vysokyy Verh, Mount Yarochysche and Mount Yalyna.

History 
The first record of the village dates back to 1675 year. 

Until 18 July 2020, Verkhnia Rozhanka belonged to Skole Raion. The raion was abolished in July 2020 as part of the administrative reform of Ukraine, which reduced the number of raions of Lviv Oblast to seven. The area of Skole Raion was merged into Stryi Raion.

Attractions 
The village has two sights of architecture of Stryi Raion.
 Church of the Holy Spirit (wood, 1804) (513 / 1)
 The bell tower of the Holy Spirit Church (wood, 1877) (513 / 2)

References

External links 
 Geographical Names, Verkhnia Rozhanka: Ukraine
 weather.in.ua

Villages in Stryi Raion